Taylor Morris may refer to:
 Taylor Morris (luger)
 Taylor Morris (figure skater)